"Towards the Sun" is a song recorded by the Barbadian singer Rihanna for the soundtrack to the 2015 film Home. The song was premiered on BBC Radio 1 on February 9, 2015, and it was released for digital download as the soundtrack's lead single the same day by Westbury Road. The song was set to play on  mainstream radio on March 17, 2015, but the radio release was cancelled. The song was written and produced by Tiago Carvalho and Gary Go, with additional writing by Rihanna.

"Towards the Sun" is a mid-tempo pop and R&B ballad with positive and optimistic lyrics. On release, it received positive reviews from music critics who praised Rihanna's vocals and compared the song to the works of the British band Coldplay and their 2012 collaboration with Rihanna, "Princess of China". Commercially the song was a moderate success, peaking at 76 on the UK Singles Chart and 22 on the French singles chart.

Background 
In June 2012, it was announced that Rihanna would star in the lead role in the film Happy Smekday! with the American actor Jim Parsons. In September 2012, 20th Century Fox and DreamWorks Animation announced that the movie would be released on November 26, 2014. In June 2013, the film was retitled from as Home. In 2014, Variety magazine reported that, in addition to her voice role, Rihanna had created a concept album for the film which was to be released on March 13, 2015. It was later reported that the film's soundtrack would also include songs recorded by Charli XCX, Kiesza and Jennifer Lopez. "Towards the Sun" was written by Tiago Carvalho, Gary Go and Rihanna. Scott Mills premiered the song on BBC Radio 1 on February 9, 2015 and it was made available for digital download the same day on the iTunes Store. It was supposed to be on US Top 40/Mainstream radio on March 3, 2015, but its release was cancelled at the last minute.

Composition and lyrics 
"Towards the Sun" is a mid-tempo pop and R&B ballad with a length of four minutes and thirty-three seconds. The single has "pounding" drums, sing-along lyrics, "gigantic" chorus, "layered harmonies", "swirling effects" and uplifting, positive lyrics. Nolan Feeney of Time noted that the song features "a children's choir and  atmospherics". Andrew Trendell of Gigwise described it as a "slow-burning stomper of a number, loaded with huge drums and arena backing vocals", further comparing it to the works of the British band Coldplay. Daniel Welsh of The Huffington Post UK agreed with Trendell about the Coldplay comparison and linked the song to the band's 2012 collaboration with Rihanna, "Princess of China". Jason Lipshutz of Billboard compared the song's mid-tempo groove to the one on the singer's 2012 single, "Diamonds". New York Post'''s Jaclyn Hendricks noted that the song has a "livelier" production than Rihanna's previous single, her collaboration with Kanye West and Paul McCartney, "FourFiveSeconds" (2015).

Madison Vain of Entertainment Weekly opined that the song is "anthemic" and "whispier" than Rihanna's previous singles. According to Brittany Spanos of Rolling Stone, the song is more optimistic and positive than her previous singles and albums which could be heard in the lines, "Turn your face towards the sun. Let the shadows fall behind you." According to Welsh the song's lyrics are "seriously empowering" and "very dramatic stuff". MTV News Brenna Enrlich called the song "heroic" in which Rihanna is clearly singing to turn the face to the shadows and look at the sun.

 Critical reception 
Daniel Welsh of The Huffington Post UK praised "Towards the Sun"'s lyrics, its production, Rihanna's voice on the song and its chorus. According to him, "with the theatrical atmosphere of the track, we can imagine the chorus will sound particularly anthemic being sung by a stadium crowd". Spins Brennan Carley called the song "bombastic" and also praised its chorus and the "anthemic" nature. Trendell noted, "The result is no less than epic and triumphant. Expect this to soundtrack many a victory this summer." Spanos praised Rihanna's falsetto on the song and called the track "epic" and "empowering".

 Credits and personnel 
Credits adapted from the liner notes of Home''.

Locations
Recorded at The Canvas Room, London
Mixed at Larabee Studios, North Hollywood, Los Angeles

Personnel

Lead vocals – Rihanna
Songwriting – Tiago Carvalho, Gary Go, Robyn Fenty
Production – Tiago
Co-production – Gary Go
Additional vocals and instrumentation – Tiago, Gary Go
Choir – Ifield Community College Choir
Choir master – Patrick Allen
Engineer – Andreas Eide Larsen
Assistant engineer – B.B. Banks
Vocal production – Kuk Harrell
Recording – Marcos Tovar, Kuk Harrell
Mixing – Manny Marroquin
Assistant mixing – Chris Galland, Jeff Jackson, Ike Schultz

Charts

Release history

References 

2015 songs
2015 singles
Rihanna songs
Songs written by Rihanna
2010s ballads
Pop ballads
Songs written by Gary Go
Songs written for animated films
Songs written for films